Pidcock Creek is a tributary of the Delaware River in Bucks County, Pennsylvania. Rising in Buckingham Township, it flows into the Delaware in Solebury Township after a short side trip within Upper Makefield Township.

History
Pidcock Creek was named for John Pidcock, early settler, occupying in 1698, and purchasing on 31 May 1701 from Gilbert Wheeler, the tract later known as the Thompson-Neely tract. The tract also included an old Lenape village called Win-na-haw-caw-chunk in the Wheeler and Pidcock deeds.

Statistics
Pidcock Creek was added to the Geographic Names Information System of the U.S. Geological Survey on 2 August 1979 as identification number 1183702. U.S. Department of the Interior Geological Survey I.D. is 03002.

Course
Pidcock Creek rises in Buckingham Township from an unnamed pond and quickly receives two tributaries, one from the left and one from the right. Flowing into Solebury Township, it eventually turn to the southeast where it receives Curls Run from the right. Then it makes a short jaunt into Upper Makefield Township where it picks up another tributary from the right and returns to Solebury after which it turn eastward, then makes an "S" bend where it receives another tributary from the right then it meets its confluence at the Delaware's 146.30 river mile.

Tributaries
Curls Run

Municipalities
Bucks County
Solebury Township
Upper Makefield Township
Buckingham Township

Crossings and bridges
Pennsylvania Canal (Delaware Division)
Bowmans Hill Tower Road
Van Sant Covered Bridge is number 80003438 on the National Register of Historic Places.
Pidcock Creek Road
Holicong Road

See also
List of rivers of Pennsylvania
List of rivers of the United States
List of Delaware River tributaries

References

Rivers of Bucks County, Pennsylvania
Rivers of Pennsylvania
Tributaries of the Delaware River